The Shadow in the Glass is a BBC Books original novel written by Stephen Cole and Justin Richards and based on the long-running British science fiction television series Doctor Who. It features the Sixth Doctor and Brigadier Lethbridge-Stewart, investigating the apparent resurrection of Adolf Hitler.

The book was a late replacement in the schedule, a result of Gary Russell's Instruments of Darkness being late in its delivery. The Shadow in the Glass was written so as to fit the title Instruments of Darkness, although in the end the title was retained for Russell's book, which was published later in the Past Doctor Adventures series.

Premise
Brigadier Lethbridge-Stewart discovers an odd mystery. A plane being shot down in World War 2 was nothing out of the ordinary...but the fact the crash site is still being guarded decades later is. The Doctor moves in to investigate this oddness.

External links

The Cloister Library - The Shadow in the Glass

2001 British novels
2001 science fiction novels
Past Doctor Adventures
Sixth Doctor novels
Novels by Justin Richards
Novels by Stephen Cole
Cultural depictions of Adolf Hitler